Chitralekha is a 1941 Indian Hindi-language film, directed by Kidar Sharma and based on the 1934 Hindi novel of the same name by Bhagwati Charan Verma.  Its music is by noted classical musician Ustad Jhande Khan, giving popular songs like "Sun sun Neelkamal Muskaye," "Saiyyan Saware Bhaye Baware," and "Tum Jao Bde Bhagwan Bane, Insaan Bano."

It was the second-highest grossing Indian film of 1941. Khan used classical Ragas like Bhairavi and Asavari to the score, making it influential for classical based Hindi film songs. This was the debut of actor Bharat Bhushan, who later achieved fame with Baiju Bawra (1952). Sharma cast Mehtab as he felt she was "perfect" for the role of Chitralekha. Mehtab achieved both fame and notoriety with the famous bathing scene in the film.

It was remade by Sharma in 1964, also titled Chitralekha, starring Meena Kumari and Ashok Kumar.

Cast
 Miss Mehtab as Chitralekha
 Nandrekar as Samant Bijgupt
 A.S. Gyani as Kumargiri
 Rajendra
 Monica Desai as Yashodhara
 Ram Dulari
 Leela Mishra
 Ganpatrai Premi as Mrityunjay
 Bharat Bhushan

Soundtrack
The music of the film was composed by Ustad Jhande Khan.

References

Bibliography

External links
 

1941 films
1940s Hindi-language films
Films based on Indian novels
Films set in the 3rd century BC
Films set in the Maurya Empire
Indian drama films
Indian black-and-white films
1941 drama films
Films directed by Kidar Sharma
Hindi-language drama films
Films set in ancient India
Films about courtesans in India